Sri Lanka arrived in Manchester for their twelfth Commonwealth Games, bringing a total of 31 male and 25 female athletes competing in  Athletics, Badminton, Boxing, Netball, Rugby 7's, Shooting Squash, Swimming and Weightlifting
This large team failed to win any medals, a disappointment compared to the previous two games and the following one in Melbourne.

See also
2002 Commonwealth Games results

References

2002
2002 in Sri Lankan sport
Nations at the 2002 Commonwealth Games